Bakalinsky District (Baqalı rayonı; , Baqalı rayonı) is an administrative and municipal district (raion), one of the fifty-four in the Republic of Bashkortostan, Russia. It is located in the west of the republic and borders with Ilishevsky District in the northeast, Chekmagushevsky District in the east, Sharansky District in the south, and with the Republic of Tatarstan in the west and northwest. Its administrative center is the rural locality (a selo) of Bakaly. As of the 2010 Census, the total population of the district was 28,776, with the population of Bakaly accounting for 33.3% of that number.

Geography
The district is located around the Bugulminskoye-Belebey Mountains sloping gently to the north in the valley of the Belaya River. The climate is continental with moderate humidity. In the elevated part of the watershed it is characterized by mixed deciduous forests, with oak, birch, and aspen. Forests cover 44% of the area and there are several oil fields, such as Mustafinskoye and Katayevskoye.

History
The district was established on August 20, 1930.

Administrative and municipal status
Within the framework of administrative divisions, Bakalinsky District is one of the fifty-four in the Republic of Bashkortostan. The district is divided into seventeen selsoviets, comprising ninety-six rural localities. As a municipal division, the district is incorporated as Bakalinsky Municipal District. Its seventeen selsoviets are incorporated as seventeen rural settlements within the municipal district. The selo of Bakaly serves as the administrative center of both the administrative and municipal district.

References

Notes

Sources

Districts of Bashkortostan
States and territories established in 1930